Ajuga pyramidalis, commonly known as pyramidal bugle, is a flowering plant of the genus Ajuga in the family Lamiaceae. It is a native plant in Europe.

Description
At the base there is a rosette of stalked leaves which are significantly larger than the stem leaves. The stiff upright hairy stem is square and bears simple leaves growing in opposite pairs. They are ovate, hairy above and below and have a slightly wavy edge. The inflorescence has leaf-like bracts subtending the individual flowers. The bracts gradually get smaller towards the tip of the inflorescence, are always longer than the flowers and the upper ones are often tinged purple. The inflorescence forms a pyramid-shaped terminal spike and is formed of axillary whorls. The calyx of each flower is five-lobed, the bluish-violet corolla has a long tube and is fused, with two lips. The upper lip is very short and the lower lip is three-lobed. There are four stamens, two long and two short. The gynoecium is formed of two fused carpels and the fruit is a four-chambered schizocarp. The hermaphrodite flowers are zygomorphic. The flowers produce nectar to attract pollinators which are bumblebees and butterflies.

The flowering time extends from June to August. The chromosome number is 2n = 32.

Ecology

The bracts in the inflorescence form effective shelters for the flowers from rain, their red-violet color enhances the signal effect of the flowers. The shaggy hairiness of the calyx protects the flower against small, crawling insects. The nectar is additionally secured by a stiff, upturned hair ring.

The fruits with fleshy, oily appendages (elaiosomes) are quickly taken by ants.

Distribution
Rocky ground, very rare in Ireland. Also found in Scotland and Westmorland in England.

Occurrence

The pyramid bugle is native to in northern Europe and the Caucasus where it occurs at sea level in the British Isles, in the mountains of central and southern Europe, and in northern and western Scandinavia. It grows on almost neutral soils in open grassland, heathland and rock ledges.

Uses

The pyramid bugle, like many Ajuga species, is often erroneously  claimed to hold medicinal properties and may be used for wound treatment and for metabolic disorders.

References

Xaver Finkenzeller: Alpenblumen, München 2003, 
M. A. Fischer, W. Adler & K Oswald.: Exkursionsflora für Österreich, Liechtenstein und Südtirol, Linz, 2005, 
Erich Oberdorfer: Pflanzensoziologische Exkursionsflora für Deutschland und angrenzende Gebiete. 8 Auflage. Verlag Eugen Ulmer, Stuttgart 2001. 

pyramidalis
Flora of Europe
Plants described in 1753
Taxa named by Carl Linnaeus